Dehri-on-Sone railway station (station code: DOS) is on the Gaya–Mughalsarai section of the Grand Chord line. It stands next to the Nehru Setu and serves Dehri and the surrounding areas in Rohtas district in the Indian state of Bihar. It's located on the banks of Son river, a tributary of river Ganges.

History
The Grand Chord was commissioned in 1906.

Dehri Rohtas Light Railway

It was closed in 1984.

Electrification
The Gaya–Mughalsarai sector was electrified in 1961–63.

Amenities
Dehri-on-Sone railway station has 1 non-AC retiring room, and a four-bedded non-AC dormitory. It has a restaurant. The station has computerized reservation facilities.

References

External links
Trains at Dehri-on-Sone

Railway stations in Rohtas district
Mughalsarai railway division
Railway stations opened in 1906
Dehri
1906 establishments in India